Judziki may refer to the following places:
Judziki, Podlaskie Voivodeship (north-east Poland)
Judziki, Ełk County in Warmian-Masurian Voivodeship (north Poland)
Judziki, Olecko County in Warmian-Masurian Voivodeship (north Poland)